Sebo is both a given name and surname. Notable people with the name include:

Sebo Colloredo (born 1987), Italian ski jumper
Sebo Shahbazian (born 1980), Iranian footballer
Sebő Vukovics (1811–1872), Hungarian politician
Sebo Walker (born 1988), American skateboarder
Ágota Sebő (born 1934), Hungarian swimmer
András Sebő (born 1954), Hungarian-French mathematician
Ferenc Sebő (born 1947), Hungarian folklorist and musician
Filip Šebo (born 1984), Slovak footballer
Jeff Sebo (born 1983), American philosopher
Sam Sebo (1910–1933), American football player
Steve Sebo (1917–1989), American football and baseball player